Metopus filum is a species of metopid first found in soil from the Murray River floodplain, Australia. It can be distinguished from its congeners by its thin body, an absence of cortical granules, and a low number of ciliary rows and adoral polykinetids.

References

Intramacronucleata
Protists described in 2016